Frederick Percy Hardy (26 June 1880 – 9 March 1916) was a first-class cricketer who played for Somerset.

Career
Hardy was a left-handed batsman who sometimes opened the innings and a right-arm medium-pace bowler. He played for Surrey's colts team, but left to join Somerset. He made his debut in 1902 and in his second match took the slip catch that dismissed Victor Trumper for just five – Trumper was dismissed a second time for five by the same bowler, George Gill, later in the match.

Hardy played as a professional in a mainly amateur team and made fairly regular appearances for Somerset right through to 1914. In 1910, when the side lost 15 out of 18 County Championship matches and failed to secure a single point all season, he headed the Somerset batting figures with 700 runs, including his own highest score of 91 against the champions, Kent, at Taunton. His best bowling figures, six for 82, also came in that season, against Middlesex at Bath.

Death
Hardy's death is something of a mystery. He was, in the words of Wisden's 1917 edition, "found dead on the floor of a lavatory at King's Cross station (G.N.R.)... His throat was cut and a blood-stained knife was by his side." Hardy was serving as a private with the 3rd County of London Yeomanry (Sharpshooters) at the time. The historian David Foot wrote that the knife was Hardy's own and that the death was suicide brought on by distress at being sent back to the World War I battlefield. Hardy, who left a widow, Maud Mary, was buried at St Mary's Roman Catholic Cemetery, Kensal Green.

References

External links

1880 births
1916 suicides
English cricketers
Somerset cricketers
People from Blandford Forum
Cricketers from Dorset
Dorset cricketers
Marylebone Cricket Club cricketers
City of London Yeomanry (Rough Riders) soldiers
British Army personnel of World War I
British military personnel killed in World War I
Suicides in Camden
Suicides by sharp instrument in England
1916 deaths